The House of Windsor is a British comedy television series which first aired on ITV in 1994. A top public relations expert is called in to help the British Royal Family with their image, but he clashes constantly with the more traditional Lord Bermondsey.

Main cast
 Leslie Phillips as Lord Montague Bermondsey
 Warren Clarke as Max Kelvin
 Neil Stacy as Sir Nicholas Foulsham
 Serena Gordon as Caroline Finch
 Jeremy Sinden as Giles Huntingdon
 Sean Gallagher as Ray Barker
 Louise Germaine as Kate Hargreaves
 Barry Howard as  Danny Jackson 
 Preston Lockwood as  Ambrose Stebbings
 Margaret Courtenay as Lady Sharpcott

References

Bibliography
 Leslie Halliwell & John Walker. Halliwell's Who's who in the Movies. HarperCollinsEntertainment, 2001.

External links
 

ITV sitcoms
1994 British television series debuts
1994 British television series endings
1990s British comedy television series
Television series by ITV Studios
Television shows produced by Granada Television
English-language television shows